DXKO (103.1 FM), on-air as 103.1 Gold FM, is a radio station owned and operated by Kalayaan Broadcasting System. The station's studio is located along Vinzon St., Digos.

References

Radio stations established in 2008
Radio stations in Davao del Sur